Ischnoderma resinosum is a species of fungus in the family Fomitopsidaceae. Its spongy but tough, sweet-smelling flesh exudes a red liquid when young. This fungus fruits on hardwood logs and stumps in late autumn. A widely distributed species, it has been recorded from Africa, Asia, Europe, and North America.

The species was originally described as Boletus resinosus in 1794 by German botanist Heinrich Schrader. It has acquired an extensive synonymy in its taxonomic history, having been juggled between several genera. Petter Karsten transferred it to Ischnoderma in 1879 to give it the name by which it is currently known. Young, soft specimens may be cooked and eaten, but the species becomes hard and unpalatable later in life.

Ischnoderma benzoinum is similar and has darker flesh.

References

Fomitopsidaceae
Fungi described in 1794
Fungi of Africa
Fungi of Asia
Fungi of Europe
Fungi of North America
Edible fungi
Taxa named by Heinrich Schrader (botanist)